Northwest Field (historically Northwest Guam Air Force Base) is a military airfield in Guam.

History 
Built in 1945 during World War II, the airfield was used as a bomber base during and after the war. It was closed in 1949.

Units deployed to the airfield included the 315th Bombardment Wing, stationed from 1945 to 1946, and the 23rd Fighter Group, stationed from 1946 to 1949.

Since around 2010, the airfield has been partially reactivated. It is used for training related to operating at airfields in austere conditions, including being one of the locations to host Cope North exercises.

See also
 US military installations in Guam

References 

Installations of the United States Air Force
Defunct airports in the United States
Airports in Guam
Military installations of the United States in Guam
Airfields of the United States Army Air Forces in the Pacific Ocean theatre of World War II